"Ten Steps Back" is a song by German recording artist Jessica Wahls. It was written by Anders Bagge, Arnthor Birgisson, and Kandi Burruss, and produced by Björn Krumbügel, featuring co-production from Yann "Yanou" Peifer. Cheyenne Records and Polydor Island released the uptempo song as Wahls's solo debut single on 8 September 2003 following her departure from No Angels. It debuted and peaked at number 41 on the German Singles Chart.

Track listings

Personnel and credits 
Credits adapted from the liner notes of "Ten Steps Back."

 Anders Bagge – writing
 Arnthor Birgisson – writing
 Kandi Burruss – writing
 Nike Hafeman – vocal recording
 Björn Krumbügel – production

 Alexa Phazer – backing vocals
 Peter Ries – mixing
 Solomon Thomas – arrangement
 Yanou – co-production, arrangement
 Ulf Zwerger – vocal recording

Charts

Release history

References

2003 songs
Polydor Records singles